Cəfərli (also, Dzhafarli and Dzhafarly) is a village in the Qazakh Rayon of Azerbaijan.

References 

Populated places in Qazax District